Fulda gatiana is a species of butterfly in the family Hesperiidae. It is found in northern Madagascar.

References

Butterflies described in 1923
Astictopterini